The Carteret Islands (also known as Carteret Atoll, Tulun or Kilinailau Islands/Atoll) are Papua New Guinea islands located 86 km (53 mi) north-east of Bougainville in the South Pacific.

The group is made up of islands collectively named after the British navigator Philip Carteret, who was the first European to discover them, arriving in the sloop  in 1767. , about one thousand people live on the islands. Han is the most significant island, with the others being small islets around the lagoon.  The main settlement is at Weteili on Han. The island is near the edge of the large geologic formation called the Ontong Java Plateau.

History 

When visited in 1830 by Benjamin Morrell in the schooner Antarctic, several islands had a native population who were growing several crops.  One small island was uninhabited and covered with heavy timber.  With the approval of the area's ruler, Morrell's crew began construction on the southwest corner of the island in the northeast part of the atoll, with the intent to harvest snail meat and edible bird nests for the Chinese market.

Departing after a fatal attack on his crew, Morrell named the islands the Massacre Islands.

Food staples have been cultivated: taro and coconut and fishing supports the people.  The area had been inhabited for about 1,000 years before European contact in about 1880, when the copra trade and other activities altered the economy and customs.  Population grew rapidly in the early 1900s, and overcrowding in the 1930s caused a population decline. Food shortages since the 1960s, in recent times caused by international commercial fishers, caused resettlement of some islanders to the Kuveria area of Bougainville from 1984 through the late 1980s. In the 1990s the islanders were identified as economic refugees. Although taro has been a cultivated crop planted in watered areas, by 2002 that had been forgotten by an island leader who complained about wild taro no longer growing.

Carteret Islanders

The Carteret Islands inhabitants are a Halia-speaking community closely related to the population of Hanhan Bay, in nearby Buka Island. Their customs are very similar to those of the Buka, although with some important adaptations to the atoll environment.  The Carteret Islanders call themselves the Tuluun.

Like the Halia, Hakö, Selau and Solos groups in Buka and Bougainville, the Tuluun reckon descent matrilineally. They are primarily organized into two moiety-like groups, the Nakaripa and Naboen. Unlike moieties in a true dual organization system, Nakaripa and Naboen are not exogamous in practice, though a strong preference for exogamy is usually reported. Exogamy is important in the organization of political power. Male and female chiefs attempt to organize cross-moiety marriages, the main reason for this being that the legitimation of chiefly power requires the participation of the opposite moiety.

Oral tradition states that the Carteret Islands were originally inhabited by a Polynesian group closely related to the Nukumanu, or Mortlock Islanders. The islands were discovered by a fishing expedition from Hahalis. According to the Halia tradition, the first attempt to reach the islands had a peaceful intention, but ended in the massacre of the Halia expedition. The Munihil, or paramount chief of Hanahan Bay then organized a large flotilla of canoes to attack the Polynesian population, and conquered the islands. By contrast, the Mortlock Islanders state that the Halia mounted a blood and murder surprise attack to remove their relatives.

Genealogical information suggest that the Halia invasion took place in the early 18th century. Lieutenant Erasmus Gower (sailing with Commander Philip Carteret) reported the population as being dark-skinned in 1767.

Physical atoll conditions
Like many other atolls throughout the Pacific Ocean, this one is very low-lying and its main constituent, the coral, needs to be covered in water most of the time. Land is created by the ocean when some vegetation, such as a coconut palm or mangrove shoots, take hold in the much shallower parts of the reef. One tree leads to a slight buildup of coral sand around its base. This leads to more trees (palms) and the size of the individual islets on the reef grow. Over the long period the islands progress from the seaward edge of the atoll towards the lagoon as the sand is blown and washed towards the calmer shore. It is easy to determine the direction of the prevailing winds by observing the position and condition of the islets on the reef.

Palms or trees that become exposed in storms usually die by losing their grip in the little sand left at the end of the storm season. Sometimes whole islets get washed away.

People live on the larger island or islands formed around the atoll and trek back and forth to the smaller ones by walking the reef at low tide or by small canoes. Much of the taro is grown away from the inhabited island. It is often very vulnerable to salt-water inundation, but by being away from the living area is protected from human-waste contamination.

Flooding

It was widely reported in November 2005 that the islands have progressively become uninhabitable, with an estimate of their total submersion by 2015. The islanders have fought a more than twenty years' battle, building a seawall and planting mangroves. However, storm surges and high tides continue to wash away homes, destroy vegetable gardens and contaminate fresh water supplies.  The natural tree cover on the island is also being impacted by the incursion of saltwater contamination of the fresh water table.

Cause of Carteret inundation

Paul Tobasi, the atolls' district manager with Papua New Guinea's Bougainville province, and many other environmental groups have suggested that the flooding is the result of sea level rise associated with global warming.  He also stated that small storm surges were becoming more frequent.

Those convinced the islands are sinking, not the sea-level rising, also propose that, "Some depletion of the fresh water aquifer may also contribute to the sinking," but do not explain how depletion of the fresh water aquifer could be significant on an island that is no more than 1.5 m higher than sea-level. Also cited by Dr. Ray, "The region is also tectonically active and subsiding land is a real possibility." However, The Carteret Islands lie on the Pacific Plate, lying east of and above where the Solomon Sea plate is subducting underneath it.

Fred Terry, the director of the United Nations Development Project on Bougainville, said the destruction of reefs in the Carterets with dynamite might be the cause of flooding on Carteret Islands.

Ongoing relocation
There have been a number of different relocation schemes initiated since the 1980s. These have had mixed success with many of the relocated families subsequently returning home.

On 25 November 2003, the Papua New Guinean government authorized the government-funded total evacuation of the islands, 10 families at a time; the evacuation was expected to be completed by 2007, but access to funding caused numerous delays.

In October 2007 it was announced that the Papua New Guinea government would provide two million kina (US$736,000) to begin the relocation, to be organized by Tulele Peisa of Buka, Bougainville. Five men from the island moved to Bougainville in early 2009 who built some houses and planted crops for their families to follow. There was a plan to bring another 1700 people over the next five years. However, there has been no large-scale evacuation seem set into effect as of November 2011. In 2016, Ursula Rakova's Tulele Peisa expressed its target to relocate half the population before 2020. Tulele Peisa has 85 hectares of land at the main island of the Autonomous Region of Bougainville, to the east of mainland Papua New Guinea, to resettle 35 families. As of 2021, 10 families have been relocated to Tinputz.

In 2007, CNN reported that the Carteret islanders will be the first island community in the world to undergo an organized relocation in response to rising sea levels.  The people of the Carteret are being called the world's first environmental refugees.

In 2017 the Finnish Embassy in Canberra, which is involved in an aid project, reported that despite the relocation efforts, there are more people than ever living at the atoll, and the atoll has practically doubled its population.

See also
Sun Come Up

References

External links
 "Tulun" – Black and white photo reportage from 2009 Accessed 27 February 2011
  "Sinking Paradise – Carteret Islands, Papua New Guinea" United Nations University Videobrief Accessed 20 April 2009
 God Help Me and My People Carteret Islander Ursula Rakova describes her life on the island and her thoughts on losing them.
 ABC TV report on the Carteret Islands by Steve Marshall 13 March 2007
 Carteret Islands to be evacuated – Video report by Pip Starr
 Tectonic plates in region – University of North Dakota
   Estimation of current plate motions in Papua New Guinea from GPS observations – Research School of Earth Sciences, The Australian National University, Canberra, A.C.T., Australia
 Pacific Atlantis: first climate change refugees – The Guardian 25 November 2005
 Islands battle rising seas for survival – Reuters Alertnet 23 November 2005
 Islanders face rising seas with nowhere to go – Sydney Morning Herald 30 March 2002
 Photographs taken on Tulun in 1960 – National Library of Australia
  at oceandots.com (includes satellite image)
 http://edition.cnn.com/video/player/player.html?url=/video/tech/2007/01/16/geissler.big.melt.carteret.island.itn at cnn.com (includes video coverage)
 http://www.coexploration.org/bbsr/coral/html/body_reef_formation.htm
 Documentary: The Next Wave
 2011 Oscar-nominated documentary: "Sun Come Up", which portrays the plight of the world's first climate change refugees.
 CarteretNow German/English website covering recent developments

Atolls of Papua New Guinea
Geography of the Autonomous Region of Bougainville
Solomon Islands (archipelago)
Islands of Papua New Guinea
Volcanoes of Bougainville Island